Dr. Mahesh Sharma is an Indian politician belonging to the Bharatiya Janata Party and currently serving as a Member of Parliament in the 17th Lok Sabha from Gautam Buddh Nagar seat. He was elected in the 2014 Indian general election from Gautam Buddh Nagar. He is a physician by profession and owns the Kailash Group of Hospitals based in Noida. On 12 November 2014, he was appointed a Minister of State (Independent Charge) for Culture and Tourism and Civil Aviation. He has also served as the first MLA of Noida Vidhan Sabha in Uttar Pradesh.

He has also played a key role in shaping the vision of the Bhartiya Janata Party (BJP) at the state as well as at the central level. Recently, recognizing his experience and party organizational skills,  Sharma has been appointed in-charge of BJP Tripura for upcoming 2024 Lok Sabha elections.

Life and career
Mahesh Sharma was born on 30 September 1959 in Manethi village near Neemrana in Alwar district of Rajasthan. His father, Kailash Chand Sharma, was a school teacher. He did his early schooling in the village. For senior secondary education, he moved to Delhi. He graduated from the University College of Medical Sciences. In 2012, he received an Honorary Doctorate from Amity University, Noida.

He was involved with the Rashtriya Swayamsevak Sangh (RSS) since childhood. During his student days, he became associated with the Akhil Bharatiya Vidyarthi Parishad (ABVP). Later, he joined BJP. In 2012, he was elected as an MLA from Noida during the assembly election.

After 25 years as a healthcare profession his dedication towards social welfare led him to make his electoral debut.

Political Journey 

A doctorate from Amity University, Sharma became the second-time Member of Parliament (17th Lok Sabha) in the 2019 Parliamentary elections after successfully completing his first tenure in Modi government. He won the Parliamentary elections by getting more than 50 percent of the total votes cast in Gautam Budh Nagar constituency.

Sharma was first recognized by Prime Minister Sh. Narendra Modi who gave him a place in his first cabinet in 2014. 

Sharma became the first MLA of Noida, winning by a massive margin of over 27,000 votes. He was elected as MLA from the Noida Assembly seat in Uttar Pradesh in March 2012. Apart from this, he has also participated and managed the Lok Sabha as well as the state assembly elections in Gautam Budh Nagar.

Like many politicians of the BJP, Sharma started his political journey at an early age. Being a staunch follower of Rashtriya Swayamsevak Sangh (RSS), he was associated with ABVP since his school days and joined BJP as an active member.

Personal life
Sharma is a doctor by profession. He married Uma Sharma on 22 January 1987. Uma Sharma is a gynecologist. Uma is the head of the department of obstetrics and Gynaecologist at the Kailash Hospital and Heart Institute. Dr. Uma Sharma is also the vice chairperson of the Kailash Healthcare Limited. He has a daughter, Pallavi, and a son, Kartik, both of them are also medical professionals.

News

In 2016, he visited Ravi Sisodia's family, one of the prime attackers in the 2015 Dadri lynching who died in police custody. After his visit and intervention, the local administration accepted the family's demands, including paying them ₹ 25 lakh as compensation and ordering a CBI inquiry to determine how he died.

References

External links

 Official website

Living people
India MPs 2014–2019
Lok Sabha members from Uttar Pradesh
People from Gautam Buddh Nagar district
1959 births
20th-century Indian medical doctors
Uttar Pradesh MLAs 2012–2017
Narendra Modi ministry
Recipients of the Padma Shri in trade and industry
People from Alwar district
Medical doctors from Uttar Pradesh
Indian gynaecologists
India MPs 2019–present
Culture Ministers of India
Bharatiya Janata Party politicians from Uttar Pradesh